Cristóbal Gil Martín (born 5 February 1992) is a Spanish footballer who plays for CD Guijuelo as an attacking midfielder.

Club career
Born in Málaga, Cristóbal finished his graduation in UD Almería's youth setup, and made his senior debuts with the B-team in the 2010–11 campaign, in Segunda División B.

On 6 January 2011 Cristóbal made his debut with the Andalusians' first-team, coming on as a substitute for Pablo Piatti in the 58th minute of a 4–3 win at RCD Mallorca, for the season's Copa del Rey. He then appeared on the bench in a 1–1 home draw against UD Las Palmas on 23 October, but remained unused.

After being named captain in September 2013, Cristóbal played his second match with the main squad on 18 December of the same year, starting in a 0–0 home draw against Las Palmas, again for the national Cup. On 15 July of the following year he was loaned to Gimnàstic de Tarragona, also in the third level.

On 18 August 2015 Cristóbal rescinded his link with the Rojiblancos, and signed for Cultural y Deportiva Leonesa in the same division.

References

External links

Cristóbal at La Preferente

1992 births
Living people
Footballers from Málaga
Spanish footballers
Association football midfielders
Segunda División B players
UD Almería B players
UD Almería players
Gimnàstic de Tarragona footballers
Cultural Leonesa footballers
Arenas Club de Getxo footballers
CD Guijuelo footballers
Mar Menor FC players